Following is a list of football clubs in Saint Martin, sorted geographically.

Current teams

Orléans Attackers 
ASC Saint-Louis Stars 
FC Concordia
FC Flamingo
FC Marigot
Junior Stars
United Stars

Former teams

AS Portuguese (Saint-Barthélemy)
Beach Hotel (Saint-Barthélemy)
Carcajou FC (Saint-Barthélemy)
Etudiants (Saint-Barthélemy)
FC ASCCO (Saint-Barthélemy)
Young Stars (Saint-Barthélemy)
Saint-Louis Stars (Saint-Martin) {Now known as ASC Saint-Louis Stars}
Saint-Martin Mixte Stars (Saint-Martin)
Tigers (Saint-Martin)
Juventus de Saint-Martin (Saint-Martin) {Withdrew from the 2014/15 competition}

Saint Martin